Ferocactus haematacanthus is a species of Ferocactus from Mexico.

References

External links
 
 

haematacanthus
Flora of Mexico